St. John the Evangelist Anglican Church, located at 320 Main Street,
Foam Lake, Saskatchewan, Canada is a church of the Anglican Diocese of Saskatoon. The building is designated a municipal historic site, as it was established as a mission in 1911 by the Anglican Diocese of Qu'Appelle. The building has continued as a parish church since being established.

References

Anglican church buildings in Saskatchewan
Churches completed in 1911
Heritage sites in Saskatchewan
1911 establishments in Saskatchewan
20th-century Anglican church buildings in Canada